Oufrane is a village in the commune of Metarfa, in Aougrout District, Adrar Province, Algeria.

Climate

Oufrane has a hot desert climate (Köppen climate classification BWh), with extremely hot summers and mild winters, and very little precipitation throughout the year.

References

Neighbouring towns and cities

Populated places in Adrar Province